Monstera tacanaensis  is a species of flowering plant in the genus Monstera of the arum family, Araceae.

Classification 
Monstera tacanaensis was treated as a synonym of Monstera deliciosa, however it is a closely related but different species.

Distribution 
It is native to Mexico (Chiapas), Guatemala, Costa Rica and Panama.

References 

tacanaensis
Flora of Mexico
Flora of Guatemala
Flora of Costa Rica
Flora of Panama
Plants described in 1972